Professor Matthew Baylis is executive dean of the Institute of Infection, Veterinary and Ecological Sciences at the University of Liverpool. He is also head of the Liverpool University Climate and Infectious Diseases of Animals (LUCINDA) research group.

References 

Living people
Year of birth missing (living people)
Virologists